The Shire of Gannawarra is a local government area in Victoria, Australia, located in the northern part of the state.

It includes the towns of Cohuna, Kerang, Koondrook, Leitchville and Quambatook. It was formed in 1995 from the amalgamation of the Borough of Kerang and most parts of the Shire of Kerang and Shire of Cohuna.

The Shire is governed and administered by the Gannawarra Shire Council; its seat of local government and administrative centre is located at the council headquarters in Kerang, it also has a service centre located in Cohuna. The Shire is named after a small town, that is Gannawarra, located between Cohuna and Koondrook.

The northeastern border of the shire is the Murray River. The Loddon River flows through the shire, feeding into the Murray. The Gunbower State Forest is a significant source of River Red Gum timber, supplying a historic sawmill in Koondrook. Gunbower Island is the largest inland island in the local area. It is between the Murray River and the Gunbower Creek, an anabranch of the Murray.

The western part of the shire is predominantly used for cereal grain production. The north and east have significant dairying and milk processing. Tourists are attracted to the rivers (for fishing) and also the lakes (for bird watching and water sports).

Council

Current composition
The council is composed of four wards and seven councillors, with three councillors elected to represent the Patchell Ward, two councillors elected to represent the Yarran Ward and one councillor per remaining ward elected to represent each of the other wards. The current council was elected in October 2020.

Administration and governance
The council meets in the council chambers at the council headquarters in the Kerang Municipal Offices, which is also the location of the council's administrative activities. It also provides customer services at both its administrative centre in Kerang, and its service centre in Cohuna.

Townships and localities
The 2021 census, the shire had a population of 10,683 up from 10,549 in the 2016 census

^ - Territory divided with another LGA

See also
List of places on the Victorian Heritage Register in the Shire of Gannawarra

References

External links 
 Gannawarra Shire Council official website
 Metlink local public transport map
 Link to Land Victoria interactive maps

Local government areas of Victoria (Australia)
Loddon Mallee (region)
 
North Central Victoria